The 160th Special Operations Aviation Regiment (Airborne), abbreviated as 160th SOAR (A), is a special operations force of the United States Army that provides helicopter aviation support for special operations forces. Its missions have included attack, assault, and reconnaissance, and these missions are usually conducted at night, at high speeds, low altitudes, and on short notice.

Nicknamed the Night Stalkers and called Task Force Brown within the JSOC, the 160th SOAR(A) is headquartered at Fort Campbell, Kentucky.

Overview 
The 160th SOAR (A) consists of the Army's best-qualified aviators, crew chiefs, and support soldiers. Officers are all volunteers; enlisted soldiers volunteer or are assigned by the U.S. Army Human Resources Command. Until 2013, only men were allowed to be pilots in the 160th.

Upon joining the 160th, all soldiers are assigned to "Green Platoon", in which they receive intensive training in "advanced methods of the five basic combat skills: first responder, land navigation, combatives, weapons and teamwork". The weapons training includes firing thousands of rounds with AK-47/AK-74 rifles, Beretta M9 pistol, M4/M4A1 carbines, and SIG Sauer M17/M18 pistols. Soldiers who fail to pass the course the first time may retake it, but there is no guarantee that anyone assigned to Green Platoon will pass and continue on with the 160th. The basic Night Stalker course for enlisted soldiers lasts five weeks; the officer course lasts 20 to 28 weeks.

A new Night Stalker pilot arrives at a unit as Basic Mission Qualified (BMQ). After a series of skills test qualifications, experience, leadership, and oral review boards lasting up to three years, the Night Stalker is designated Fully Mission Qualified (FMQ). After three to five years as an FMQ, the Night Stalker may try out for flight lead qualification.

SOAR flight medics can qualify as special operations combat medics by completing the 36-week long Special Operations Combat Medic (SOCM) course at Fort Bragg.

History

1980s and 1990s 
After the 1980 Operation Eagle Claw attempt to rescue American hostages held in Tehran, Iran, failed, President Jimmy Carter ordered former Chief of Naval Operations Adm. James L. Holloway III to figure out how the U.S. military could best mount another attempt. At the time there were no U.S. helicopter units trained in this kind of stealthy, short-notice Special Operations mission.

The Army looked to the 101st Aviation Group, the air arm of the 101st Airborne Division (Air Assault), which had the most diverse operating experience of the service's helicopter units, and selected elements of the 158th Aviation Battalion, 101st Aviation Battalion, 229th Aviation Battalion, and the 159th Aviation Battalion. The chosen pilots immediately entered intensive training in night flying.

This provisional unit was dubbed Task Force 158, since most of its pilots were Black Hawk aviators detached from the 158th. Their distinctive 101st "Screaming Eagle" patches remained on their uniforms. The Black Hawks and Chinooks continued to operate around Campbell Army Airfield at the north of post, and Saber Army Heliport at the south. The OH-6 Cayuses, aircraft that had vanished from the division's regular inventory after Vietnam, were hidden on base in an ammunition holding area still known as the "SHOC Pad", for "Special Helicopter Operations Company".

As the first batch of pilots completed training in the fall of 1980, a second attempt to rescue the hostages was planned for early 1981. Dubbed Operation Honey Badger, it was called off when the hostages were released on the morning of President Ronald Reagan's inauguration.

Task Force 158 was the Army's only special operations aviation unit, and its members had already become recognized as the Army's premier aviation night fighters. Their capability was judged too useful to lose, and so instead of returning to the 101st, the pilots and modified aircraft became a new unit. (Original members of the Night Stalkers refer to it as "the day the Eagles came off".) The unit was officially established on 16 October 1981, when it was designated as the 160th Aviation Battalion.

The 160th first saw combat during 1983's Operation Urgent Fury, the U.S. invasion of Grenada.

In 1986, it was renamed the 160th Aviation Group (Airborne); and in May 1990, the 160th Special Operations Aviation Regiment (Airborne). As demand for highly trained special operations aviation assets bloomed, the regiment activated three battalions, a separate detachment, and incorporated one Army National Guard unit, the 1st Battalion, 245th Aviation (OK ARNG).

In 1987 and 1988, its pilots took part in Operation Earnest Will, the protection of re-flagged Kuwaiti tankers in the Persian Gulf during the Iran–Iraq War. They flew from US Navy warships and leased oil barges in a secret sub-part called Operation Prime Chance, and became the first helicopter pilots to use night vision goggles and forward looking infrared (FLIR) devices in night combat.

In June 1988, the unit received a short-notice directive to recover a Soviet made Mi-25 Hind (Mi-24 Hind export version) attack helicopter from a remote location in Chad. The Hind was abandoned by the Libyans after 15 years of fighting, and was of great intelligence value to the U.S. In April 1988, two CH-47 Chinooks, a U.S. Air Force C-5 Galaxy, and 75 maintenance personnel and crew flew to White Sands AFB, New Mexico to rehearse the mission. In late May of that year an advance team went to Ndjamena, Chad, to await their aircraft. Two weeks later two Chinooks and 76 crew members and maintenance personnel arrived by C-5. At midnight on 11 June 1988, two MH-47s flew 490 miles at night without outside navigational aids to the target location, the Ouadi Doum Airfield in northern Chad. The first Chinook landed and configured the Hind, while the second hovered overhead and sling loaded it for return to Ndjamena. A surprise sandstorm slowed the return trip, but less than 67 hours after the arrival of the C-5 in Chad, the ground crew had the Hind and Chinooks aboard and ready for return to the U.S.

The Night Stalkers spearheaded Operation Just Cause, the 1989 invasion of Panama, and they were also used in Operation Desert Storm in 1991.

In October 1993 in Somalia, Night Stalkers became involved in the Battle of Mogadishu, which later became the subject of the book Black Hawk Down, and its film adaptation. Two Night Stalker Black Hawks, Super 6-1 (piloted by Cliff Wolcott), and Super 6-4 (piloted by Mike Durant), were shot down in the battle. Five of the eighteen men killed (not counting a nineteenth post-operation casualty) in the Battle of Mogadishu were members of the Night Stalkers team, who were lost along with the two Black Hawks.

Global War on Terrorism

2001–2005 

During the 2001 invasion of Afghanistan, the Night Stalkers from 2nd Battalion supported two task forces established in early October 2001: Dagger and Sword. (Their unit in TF Sword was designated Task Force Brown.)

The pilots of the Chinooks, flying in zero-visibility conditions, were refueled in flight three times during the 11-hour mission, establishing a new world record for combat rotorcraft. The troops—two 12-man Green Beret teams from the 5th Special Forces Group dubbed Operational Detachment Alpha (ODA) 555 and 595 plus four Air Force Combat Controllers—linked up with the CIA and Northern Alliance. Within a few weeks, the Northern Alliance, assisted by U.S. ground and air forces, captured several key cities from the Taliban.

In November 2001, Night Stalker AH-6J Little Birds took part in Objective Wolverine and Raptor missions and Operation Relentless Strike.
In December 2001, Night Stalker crews resupplied more than 150 Delta Force, British Special Boat Service, and CIA Special Activities Division operatives as they hunted for Osama bin Laden in the Tora Bora mountain complex.

On 21 February 2002, while scouting Islamist terrorists on Basilan Island as part of Operation Enduring Freedom – Philippines and seeking to rescue a nurse and an American missionary couple, a MH-47 crashed at sea in the southern Philippines' Bohol Strait, killing 10 servicemen (eight from E company, 160th SOAR and two from the 353rd Special Operations Group).

In March 2002, Night Stalkers from B Company, 2nd Battalion, 160th SOAR supported coalition troops during Operation Anaconda, particularly at the Battle of Takur Ghar on 4 March, where one of their MH-47Es, callsign Razor 03, was damaged by rocket-propelled grenades and crash-landed carrying Mako 30. A second MH-47E, callsign Razor 01, responded to the shoot down with a Quick Reaction Force; it was damaged by small arms and rocket-propelled grenades, and crash-landed. One Night Stalker was killed in the battle.

On 21 June 2002 in the Philippines, Night Stalker MH-47Es were involved in the operation that killed Abu Sabaya, a senior leader in Abu Sayyef. A U.S. Predator drone marked the person with an infrared laser as he tried to escape in a smuggler's boat. The MH-47Es trained searchlights on the boat while operators from the Philippine Naval Special Operations Group opened fire, killing the terrorist leader and capturing four other terrorists with him.

Later 2002, in Afghanistan, Task Force 11 (previously known as Task Force Sword-renamed in January 2002) was composed of DEVGRU, and a company of Rangers, and was supported by a company of helicopters from the 160th SOAR.

During the 2003 invasion of Iraq, 3rd Battalion, 160th SOAR, deployed as the Joint Special Operations Air Detachment-West under CJSOTF-West (Combined Joint Special Operations Task Force-West/Task Force Dagger). It was equipped with eight MH-47E Chinooks, four MH-60L DAPs, and two MH-60M Black Hawks. At 9 p.m. on 19 March 2003, the first strike of Operation Iraqi Freedom was carried out by members of the 160th SOAR, on Iraqi visual observation posts along the southern and western borders of Iraq. The strike groups included one flight of MH-60L DAPs and four "Black Swarm" flights, each consisting of a pair of AH-6M Little Birds; a FLIR-equipped, target-spotting MH-6M; and a pair of U.S. Air Force A-10As.

In seven hours, more than 70 sites were destroyed, effectively depriving the Iraqi military of any early warning of the coming invasion. As the sites were eliminated the first heliborne SOF teams launched from H-5 airbase in Jordan, including vehicle-mounted patrols from the British and Australian special forces, who were transported by the MH-47Es of the 160th SOAR. Night Stalkers from 1st Battalion 160th SOAR were tasked with supporting Task Force 20 with its MH-60M Black Hawks, MH-60L DAPs, MH-6M transport and AH-6M Little Birds; they were based at Ar'Ar. On 26 March, the 160th SOAR took part in the Objective Beaver mission, a raid by DEVGRU on a complex known as al Qadisiyah Research Centre that was suspected to have stocks of chemical and biological weapons.

On 1 April 2003, the 160th SOAR took part in the rescue mission of PFC Jessica Lynch who was taken prisoner during the Battle of Nasiriyah. On 2 April, a Delta Force squadron operating in Iraq was ambushed by a half-dozen armed technicals from an anti-special forces Fedayeen. Two MH-60K Black Hawks carrying a parajumper medical team and two MH-60L DAPs of the 160th SOAR responded and engaged the Iraqis, which allowed the Delta operators to move their two casualties to an emergency HLZ. However, one Delta Force operator succumbed to his wounds.

On the evening of 13 December 2003, Saddam Hussein was captured by U.S. forces in Operation Red Dawn, he was exfiltrated by a MH-6 Little Bird from the 160th SOAR and he was taken into custody at Baghdad International Airport.
 
In 2004 they took part in the rescue of three Italian contractors and one Polish businessman held for ransom by Iraqi insurgents.

In Afghanistan in 2005: Eight Night Stalkers (four from HHC and four from Bravo company of 3rd Battalion) were killed along with eight Navy SEALs on a rescue mission for Marcus Luttrell, after their MH-47 Chinook helicopter was hit by an RPG (rocket propelled grenade). They were sent out to look for Luttrell after Operation Red Wings, in which he was involved with three other SEALs, was compromised and Luttrell's teammates killed.

2006–2009 
In March 2006, SEALs from DEVGRU and Rangers were flown by the 160th SOAR into in North Waziristan, Pakistan, to assault an al-Qaeda training camp, allegedly under the codename: Operation Vigilant Harvest, the assaulters killed as many as 30 terrorists including the camps commandant.

On 14 May 2006, helicopters from the 160th SOAR brought operators from Delta Force's B Squadron to Yusufiyah, Iraq, to fight al-Qaeda fighters in several buildings. As the operators disembarked their helicopters, they came under fire from a nearby house, and more al-Qaeda fighters soon joined the firefight. The door gunners of the 160th's Black Hawks fired at the insurgents; a pair of AH-6M Little Birds carried out strafing runs. One Little Bird from the 160th's 1st Battalion, B Company, was shot down. An estimated 25 al-Qaeda fighters were killed.

In July 2006, a pair of MH-47Es from 160th SOAR attempted to insert a combined strike element of DEVGRU, Rangers, and Afghan commandos in Helmand Province, Afghanistan, to attack a compound. With some troops on the ground, a large insurgent force ambushed them. Both helicopters were struck by small arms fire. One MH-47E pilot put his aircraft in the line of fire to protect the other MH-47E as its assault team disembarked. An RPG hit the shielding MH-47E, whose pilot crash-landed with no serious injuries to operators or aircrew. The Ranger commander and an attached 2nd Commando Regiment operator organised an all-round defence while the other MH-47E held back the advancing insurgents until its miniguns ran out of ammunition. An AC-130 Spectre joined the battle and kept the down crew and passengers safe until a British Immediate Response Team helicopter recovered them. The AC-130 then destroyed the MH-47E wreck, denying it to the Taliban.

Elements of 3rd Battalion 160th SOAR have conducted episodic deployments in support of Operation Enduring Freedom—Caribbean and Central America, begun in 2008. Night Stalker helicopters were present during the 2008 SOCOM counter-terror exercises in Denver. On 24 April 2008, Company D, 3rd Battalion, 160th SOAR was inactivated at a ceremony conducted at Hunter Army Airfield, Georgia, as part of a regimental transformation plan. The 160th SOAR also took part in the 2008 Abu Kamal raid.

On 19 August 2009, four Night Stalkers from D Company, 1st Battalion, 160th SOAR lost their lives in a MH-60 Black Hawk helicopter crash in Leadville, Colorado, during mountain and environmental training. On 9 September 2009 in Afghanistan, Night Stalkers inserted the British SBS and SFSG into Kunduz Province to rescue Times journalist Stephen Farrell after he and his Afghan interpreter were captured by the Taliban. On 19 September 2009 in Somalia, the Night Stalkers took part in Operation Celestial Balance, whose target was a senior terrorist leader connected to al-Qaeda affiliated organizations. The assault force (4 AH-6M Little Birds and 4 MH-60L Black Hawks) carried in DEVGRU operators to kill or capture the leader. AH-6Ms strafed the two-vehicle convoy, killing the leader along with three other al-Shabaab terrorists, then carried out an overwatch while DEVGRU cleared the vehicles and recovered the body.

On 22 October 2009, a 3rd Battalion helicopter crashed into the USNS Arctic during a joint training exercise involving fast roping about 20 miles off Fort Story, Virginia. The crash killed a soldier, Sergeant First Class James R. Stright, 29, and injured eight others, three seriously.

2010–2020 
In May 2011, the Night Stalkers took part in the raid on Osama bin Laden's compound. The operation involved flying covertly into Abbotabad, Pakistan in a pair of MH-60 Black Hawk helicopters, specially modified for stealth and piloted by the 160th SOAR, to take a team of Navy SEALs directly to bin Laden's compound. While one of the helicopters crash landed on arrival, all on board survived. The SEALs were successfully inserted onto the property while the crew was able to extract themselves, provide cover for the SEALs and then leave on the other helicopter. The mission was overall considered a success. The dramatic nighttime raid was "painstakingly recreated" in the film Zero Dark Thirty, which covers the CIA's efforts to track down bin Laden, from just after the September 11th attacks to the daring raid ten years later.

On 28 May 2012, Operation Jubilee took place: Black Hawks from the 160th SOAR flew in teams from the British 22 SAS and DEVGRU into Badakhshan Province, Afghanistan so they could rescue a British aid worker, a Kenyan NGO worker and 2 Afghans who were taken hostage by Bandits in the province. The rescue was a success.

On 15 January 2014, a MH-60M Black Hawk of the 160th performed a hard landing at Hunter Army Airfield in Georgia. One soldier, CPT Clayton Carpenter of NY (posthumously promoted to MAJ), was killed with another two injured. On 4 July 2014, during Operation Inherent Resolve, the Night Stalkers inserted Delta Force operators into Syria to rescue James Foley and other US hostages. One American was wounded, no hostages were found, but a substantial number of terrorists were killed. CENTCOM mistakenly posted a video on the internet of a flight of four MH-60Ms of the 160th SOAR conducting a mid-air refueling over Iraq in October 2014, the video was hastily taken down. On 26 November 2014, MH-60s flown by Nightstalkers took part in the first raid in the 2014 hostage rescue operations in Yemen.

The Night Stalkers continue to be deployed to Afghanistan as part of NATO's Resolute Support Mission after Operation Enduring Freedom-Afghanistan ended in late 2014 and was replaced with Operation Freedom's Sentinel. Throughout that night of 5 December 2015, a group of Rangers engaged in a firefight with enemy troops near the Afghan-Pakistan border; after about 5 a.m. their commander called for an extraction after they learned of a larger enemy group approaching. A helicopter from the 160th SOAR arrived and began receiving heavy fire from the enemy, with an AH-64 Apache helicopter from the 1st Battalion 101st Aviation Regiment escorting the helicopter, put their Apache directly between the U.S. troops, the helicopter and the enemy forces to draw the fire. As a result, the extraction was a success.

The Washington Post reported that 160th SOAR took part in the Yakla raid in Yemen on 29 January 2017, distinguishing itself when its helicopters flew repeatedly into heavy enemy fire to support U.S. Navy SEALs pinned down on the ground. On 25 August 2017, a Black Hawk helicopter flown by the 160th SOAR crashed off the coast of Yemen while conducting hoist training when it lost power and crashed into the sea, six servicemen survived, one US service member remained missing. CNN reported that on 27 October 2017, a US helicopter from 4th Battalion 160th SOAR crashed in Logar province, Afghanistan, killing one and injuring 6 more US service members, the crash was not a result of enemy action.

On 20 August 2018, CW3 Taylor Galvin died from injuries resulting from an MH-60M crash while conducting a partnered counter-terrorism mission in support of the Operation Inherent Resolve.

On the morning of September 18, 2021, "according to what appears to be a military incident report shared on Instagram and Reddit", a katana-wielding man attacked several SOAR soldiers at a California airport, forcing over twenty of them to "hunker down" in a hangar at Inyokern Airport, resulting in wounds to two soldiers that required stitches. "The soldiers' names were redacted in the photo shared on social media—but one was identified as a staff sergeant and the other as a captain."

Aircraft

List of known operations

Organization 
160th Special Operations Aviation Regiment (Airborne) (160th SOAR (A))

See also 
 Black helicopter
 Fort Campbell, Kentucky
 Hunter Army Airfield, Georgia
 Joint Base Lewis–McChord, Washington

Comparable U.S. units 
 8th Special Operations Squadron (1st Special Operations Wing, Air Force Special Operations Command)
 20th Special Operations Squadron (27th Special Operations Wing, Air Force Special Operations Command)
 7th Special Operations Squadron (352d Special Operations Wing, Air Force Special Operations Command)
 Helicopter Sea Combat Squadron 85 (HSC-85) (US Navy Reserve, Naval Special Warfare Command)

Comparable international units 
 Australian 171st Special Operations Aviation Squadron
 British Joint Special Forces Aviation Wing
 Canadian 427 Special Operations Aviation Squadron
 French 4th Special Forces Helicopter Regiment
 Italian 3rd Special Operations Helicopter Regiment
 Japanese 1st Helicopter Brigade

References

External links 

  of the 160th SOAR(A)
 Photographs of 160th SOAR (archived 22 June 2008)

1981 establishments in the United States
Aviation regiments of the United States Army
Battle of Mogadishu (1993)
Helicopter units and formations
Killing of Osama bin Laden
Military units and formations established in 1981
Night flying
Special operations regiments of the United States Army
United Nations operations in Somalia
United States Army Special Operations Command